The 15th Syracuse Grand Prix was a motor race, run to Formula One rules, held on 1 May 1966 at Syracuse Circuit, Sicily. The race was run over 56 laps of the circuit, and was won by British driver John Surtees in a Ferrari 312.

Jack Brabham, Vic Wilson and Denny Hulme all failed to post a time during practice, and lined up on the grid behind the last driver to post a time, André Wicky, whose time was 37.4 seconds slower than Surtees's pole time.

Results

References
 "The Grand Prix Who's Who", Steve Small, 1995.
 "Cooper Cars", Doug Nye. Motorbooks, 2003.
 Race results at www.motorsportmagazine.com 

Syracuse Grand Prix
Syracuse Grand Prix
Syracuse Grand Prix
Syracuse Grand Prix